Francesco Donato, member of the Donato family, born in Venice, Italy circa 1468, and died in Venice, Itally on May 23 1553.  He was the 79th Doge of Venice from 1545 to 1553. He was married to Giovanna Da Mula and Alicia Giustiniani.

Francesco Donato, ambassador to Spain (1504), England (1509) and Florence (1512), maintained Venice’s neutrality in the war between Charles V and Francis I, Holy Roman Emperor, and contributed to the peace treaty with Soliman. Elected Doge at the age of 77, he remained in office until his death in 1553.

References

16th-century Doges of Venice